Godzilla is the fourth studio album by Australian duo The Veronicas. It was released on 28 May 2021, and is their first album in seven years, following The Veronicas (2014).

Background
Planning for The Veronicas' fourth studio album began in 2016 with the release of the single "In My Blood", which became their third Australian number-one single. The following month in an interview with Entertainment Weekly, they confirmed they had worked with Cathy Dennis, Jim Eliot and Ollipop on an "electro-fused" album due for release in November 2016, which failed to materialise.

Subsequent singles were released; "On Your Side" in 2016 and "The Only High" in 2017. The album was then meant to be released in June 2017, but was announced on 13 November 2017 that they would not release any new material until 2018.

The single "Think of Me" was released in March 2019 and was slated as the album's first single, however no further music was released in 2019 except for buzz single "Ugly" used to promote their MTV Australia reality show The Veronicas: Blood Is for Life which aired in late 2019.

Human was originally announced as the duo's fourth album upon the release of "Biting My Tongue", however on 26 March 2021 the single "Godzilla" was released, with an album of the same name announced for release on 28 May, with Human to follow five weeks later.

Music and lyrics
Upon the announcement of the release of the two new albums, a press release was quoted by NME reported that Godzilla "will see The Veronicas assume their 'public alter egos'", while Human "promises to explore their abilities as 'vulnerable songwriters'". Described primarily as a pop rock and electropop record, the album is also noted for having influences of hard rock, grunge, hip hop, punk, electronic music, dance-pop, synth-pop and pop.

Singles
The album features singles "In My Blood" and "The Only High" released in 2016 and 2017. The album's title track was released on 26 March 2021, and was described as a "raw, angsty track that harks back to some of their earliest hits" by News.com.au. On 21 May, "Sugar Daddy" was released, which NME described as "edgy".

Reception
Jake Cleland from Stack Magazine said "Savage guitars, curly dance anthems and schoolyard bops cover enough ground that it feels curated from dozens of ideas into a rock-solid cross-section of their best ones."

Laura English from Music Feeds said "Godzilla is 12-track effort that sees The Veronicas hone in on that sound that made us all love them in the first place. It's genre-defying, it's all the best bits of electro-pop with an emo twist. But there's also a hip hop influence to the album that works so well."

Women in Pop said "Packed with every ingredient that makes pop music so special - gorgeous melodies, lyrics that connect, stunning vocals - The Veronicas have quite possibly released one of the best albums of 2021."

Retropop magazine says it's highlights are Stealing Cars, In It To Win It and 101, alongside In My Blood and The Only High 

Sanity.com.au says it "fits neatly between Hook Me Up (Their second album) and their self titled third album"

Track listing

Charts

References

2021 albums
The Veronicas albums